Chris Scott Lytle (born August 18, 1974) is a retired American mixed martial artist and boxer. An MMA professional from 1999 until 2011 and 20-fight veteran of the UFC, Lytle also fought in Pancrase, Cage Rage, and the WEC. He held the inaugural Cage Rage World Welterweight Championship and was a finalist on The Ultimate Fighter 4. During his tenure in the UFC, he was awarded "Fight of the Night" honors six times.

Background
Lytle was born in Indianapolis, Indiana, and graduated from Southport High School in 1993. At Southport, he was an active member of the Wrestling team, finishing 4th at the Indiana State Wrestling Finals in his junior year and 2nd place his senior year. In fact, to this day, he still participates in workouts at the Southport High School with the wrestling team, Coach Petty and Coach Dildine. He has also helped  coach at New Palestine High School. Lytle attended Indiana University, where he achieved a degree in sports management, and studied the Korean martial art of Tang Soo Do.

Mixed martial arts career

Early career
Lytle started training for fighting in 1998, saying that it was "something to keep me active". He trains part-time outside of his regular job as a firefighter, attending single-discipline gyms rather than MMA camps. He has held championships in the Hook N' Shoot and Absolute Fighting Championship promotions and won the Cage Rage World Welterweight Championship. He became the 175 lb Indiana state boxing champion, saying, "By the end of the year (2004), I think I'll have a few more smaller boxing titles."

Ultimate Fighting Championship
In 2006 Lytle was a contestant on The Ultimate Fighter 4 on Spike, where he defeated Pete Spratt and Din Thomas in exhibition bouts to proceed to the welterweight finale. On November 11, Matt Serra defeated Lytle by split decision in The Ultimate Fighter 4 Finale. Lytle was the more active fighter standing up, with Serra tying up and using foot stomps until he got takedowns, at which time he became the more active fighter, with Lytle holding guard and seemingly waiting for the referee to stand the fight up. Two judges scored the bout 30–27 for Serra and one judge scored the fight 30–27 for Lytle, but despite the scores the match was very close.

He lost to former UFC Welterweight Champion Matt Hughes on March 3 at UFC 68 in Columbus, Ohio via unanimous decision.

Lytle fought Jason Gilliam at UFC 73 on July 7, 2007. Lytle controlled the pace of the fight in the first round and eventually brought Gilliam to the ground. Lytle worked from top position, and eventually sunk in an inverted triangle choke from top position. To seal the fight he locked in an inverted armbar on Gilliam's free arm, forcing him to tap.

At a United Fight League show taking place in Indianapolis, Indiana on August 11, 2007, Lytle defeated Matt Brown by a guillotine choke in the second round.

Chris later lost to Thiago Alves at UFC 78 via a controversial doctor stoppage due to a cut at the end of the second round. Many fans booed as the cut was under the eye and fairly small. Typically doctors stop fights when blood his seeping into a fighters eye and impede vision.

Lytle went on to defeat Kyle Bradley at UFC 81 by KO at 33 seconds of the first round. In an interview after the fight, Lytle stated that he had a new outlook on fighting; he would no longer pursue an "overly-technical" approach to each fight, but would go into his next fight and "not be afraid to lose."

On July 5, 2008, at UFC 86 Lytle lost to Josh Koscheck in a UFC Welterweight title eliminator fight. Koscheck used an effective ground and pound style to open up massive cuts on Lytle's face and ultimately won by decision.

Lytle's next fight was against British fighter Paul Taylor at UFC 89 on October 18, 2008, in Birmingham, England. Lytle won a unanimous decision (29–28, 30–27, and 29–28). The decision resulted in loud boos and Taylor was surprised at Lytle being awarded the judges' decision.

Lytle's next fight was on January 17, 2009, against Marcus Davis at UFC 93. Both fighters are former boxers and had discussed a potential fight in their futures since early 2008. Lytle called out Davis after his win at UFC 89. He suggested that the fight take place in Ireland, where Davis had garnered a substantial following due to his emphasis on his Irish roots. Leading up to the event, both fighters promised to stand and trade blows for the entire fight, rather than engage in grappling. Lytle managed to stun Davis several times, but Davis used superior footwork, counterpunching, and kicks to win a split decision The bout shared Fight of the Night honors with the Coleman/Rua co-main event, earning Lytle a $40,000 bonus.

Lytle again won Fight of the Night at The Ultimate Fighter 9 Finale, defeating Kevin Burns, Lytle received a $25,000 bonus along with Diego Sanchez, Clay Guida, Joe Stevenson and Nate Diaz whose respective fights also won Fight of the Night. He was scheduled to fight Carlos Condit on September 16, 2009, at UFC Fight Night 19, but had to pull out due to a knee injury.

Lytle was expected to face Dong Hyun Kim on February 21, 2010, at UFC 110. This fight was later cancelled after Kim suffered a knee injury. Lytle instead faced Brian Foster at UFC 110 and was victorious via first round kneebar submission.

Lytle defeated Matt Brown on July 3, 2010, at UFC 116 via straight armbar/triangle choke in a rematch from 2007. The submission was very technical and was a strong contender for yet another Submission of the Night bonus, but said award was won by Brock Lesnar for the surprising arm triangle choke used on Shane Carwin, a choice that created minor controversy among fans. Although not another official fight bonus, Lytle was later awarded an undisclosed bonus for managing another exciting finish.

Lytle faced former UFC Welterweight Champion Matt Serra on September 25, 2010, at UFC 119 in a rematch of their 2006 bout at The Ultimate Fighter 4 Finale which he won via unanimous decision, out striking Serra throughout all three rounds.
 
Lytle was expected to face Carlos Condit on February 27, 2011, at UFC 127. However, Condit was forced from the bout after suffering a knee injury while training and replaced by UFC newcomer Brian Ebersole. Ebersole defeated Lytle via unanimous decision (30–27, 29–28, and 29–28), again winning Fight of the Night.

Lytle faced former UFC welterweight title contender Dan Hardy on August 14, 2011, at UFC on Versus 5. Chris Lytle stated at the weigh-ins he would retire after the bout regardless of the outcome.  Regarding his retirement, Chris has been quoted as saying "“I feel like I’m not being the type of dad I want to. I got four kids and lots of time I feel just an immense sense of guilt for not being there in times when I should.” Lytle defeated Hardy via guillotine choke submission in the third round after being successful early on by utilizing his superior boxing, thus closing out his MMA career with a victory and 10–10 record in the UFC. Lytle walked away with Fight of the Night and Submission of the Night honors, and earned a 2012 Softail Blackline motorcycle from Harley-Davidson for the performance.

Personal life
Lytle currently resides in New Palestine, Indiana and is married to Kristin and has four children. He works full-time as a firefighter at the Indianapolis Fire Department in addition to his fighting career.  He also ran for the Indiana State Senate in District 28 in 2012 but lost.

On July 11, 2014, it was announced that Lytle was the latest to join the panel of MMA analysts for Fox Sports 1.

Currently Lytle hosts the Lights Out Chris Lytle Show for City 360 TV in Indianapolis, Indiana.

On July 10, 2020 Lytle, along with Mike Davis and Miguel Iturrate, launched the Lytes Out Podcast.

Championships and achievements

Mixed martial arts
Ultimate Fighting Championship
First Fighter to win Fight, Submission and Knockout of the Night bonuses
Fight of the Night (Six times)
Knockout of the Night (One time)
Submission of the Night (Three times)
The Ultimate Fighter 4 Finalist
Tied (Demian Maia) for second most submissions in UFC Welterweight division history (6)
Cage Rage
Cage Rage World Welterweight Championship (One time)
Sherdog
2010 All-Violence First Team

Boxing
Indiana Boxing Association
Indiana Boxing Association Light Heavyweight Title (One time)
Two successful title defenses

Mixed martial arts record 

|-
| Win
| align=center| 31–18–5
| Dan Hardy
| Submission (guillotine choke)
| UFC Live: Hardy vs. Lytle
| 
| align=center| 3
| align=center| 4:16
| Milwaukee, Wisconsin, United States
| 
|-
| Loss
| align=center| 30–18–5
| Brian Ebersole
| Decision (unanimous)
| UFC 127
| 
| align=center| 3
| align=center| 5:00
| Sydney, Australia
| 
|-
| Win
| align=center| 30–17–5
| Matt Serra
| Decision (unanimous)
| UFC 119
| 
| align=center| 3
| align=center| 5:00
| Indianapolis, Indiana, United States
| 
|-
| Win
| align=center| 29–17–5
| Matt Brown
| Submission (inverted triangle choke and straight armbar)
| UFC 116
| 
| align=center| 2
| align=center| 2:02
| Las Vegas, Nevada, United States
| 
|-
| Win
| align=center| 28–17–5
| Brian Foster
| Submission (kneebar)
| UFC 110
| 
| align=center| 1
| align=center| 1:41
| Sydney, Australia
| 
|-
| Win
| align=center| 27–17–5
| Kevin Burns
| Decision (unanimous)
| The Ultimate Fighter 9 Finale
| 
| align=center| 3
| align=center| 5:00
| Las Vegas, Nevada, United States
| 
|-
| Loss
| align=center| 26–17–5
| Marcus Davis
| Decision (split)
| UFC 93
| 
| align=center| 3
| align=center| 5:00
| Dublin, Ireland
| 
|-
| Win
| align=center| 26–16–5
| Paul Taylor
| Decision (unanimous)
| UFC 89
| 
| align=center| 3
| align=center| 5:00
| Birmingham, England
| 
|-
| Loss
| align=center| 25–16–5
| Josh Koscheck
| Decision (unanimous)
| UFC 86
| 
| align=center| 3
| align=center| 5:00
| Las Vegas, Nevada, United States
| 
|-
| Win
| align=center| 25–15–5
| Kyle Bradley
| TKO (punches)
| UFC 81
| 
| align=center| 1
| align=center| 0:33
| Las Vegas, Nevada, United States
| 
|-
| Loss
| align=center| 24–15–5
| Thiago Alves
| TKO (doctor stoppage)
| UFC 78
| 
| align=center| 2
| align=center| 5:00
| Newark, New Jersey, United States
| 
|-
| Win
| align=center| 24–14–5
| Matt Brown
| Submission (guillotine choke)
| UFL: Fight Night at Conseco Fieldhouse
| 
| align=center| 2
| align=center| 2:49
| Indianapolis, Indiana, United States
| 
|-
| Win
| align=center| 23–14–5
| Jason Gilliam
| Submission (inverted triangle choke and americana)
| UFC 73
| 
| align=center| 1
| align=center| 2:15
| Sacramento, California, United States
| 
|-
| Loss
| align=center| 22–14–5
| Matt Hughes
| Decision (unanimous)
| UFC 68
| 
| align=center| 3
| align=center| 5:00
| Columbus, Ohio, United States
| 
|-
| Loss
| align=center| 22–13–5
| Matt Serra
| Decision (split)
| The Ultimate Fighter: The Comeback Finale
| 
| align=center| 3
| align=center| 5:00
| Las Vegas, Nevada, United States
| 
|-
| Win
| align=center| 22–12–5
| Ross Mason
| Submission (rear-naked choke)
| Cage Rage 15
| 
| align=center| 2
| align=center| 4:57
| London, England
| 
|-
| Win
| align=center| 21–12–5
| Savant Young
| TKO (submission to strikes)
| WEC 18: Unfinished Business
| 
| align=center| 1
| align=center| 3:50
| Lemoore, California, United States
| 
|-
| Loss
| align=center| 20–12–5
| Joe Riggs
| TKO (doctor stoppage)
| UFC 55: Fury
| 
| align=center| 2
| align=center| 2:00
| Uncasville, Connecticut, United States
| 
|-
| Win
| align=center| 20–11–5
| Brian Dunn
| TKO (punches)
| Legends of Fighting
| 
| align=center| 1
| align=center| 2:03
| Franklin, Indiana, United States
| 
|-
| Win
| align=center| 19–11–5
| Pat Healy
| Decision (split)
|  WEC 15: Judgment Day
| 
| align=center| 3
| align=center| 5:00
| Lemoore, California, United States
| 
|-
| Loss
| align=center| 18–11–5
| Karo Parisyan
| Decision (unanimous)
| UFC 51: Super Saturday
| 
| align=center| 3
| align=center| 5:00
| Las Vegas, Nevada, United States
| 
|-
| Win
| align=center| 18–10–5
| J.T. Taylor
| Submission (forearm choke)
| WEC 12
| 
| align=center| 1
| align=center| 2:53
| Lemoore, California, United States
| 
|-
| Win
| align=center| 17–10–5
| Ronald Jhun
| Submission (guillotine choke)
| UFC 49
| 
| align=center| 2
| align=center| 1:17
| Las Vegas, Nevada, United States
| 
|-
| Win
| align=center| 16–10–5
| Tiki Ghosn
| Submission (bulldog choke)
| UFC 47
| 
| align=center| 2
| align=center| 1:55
| Las Vegas, Nevada, United States
| 
|-
| Win
| align=center| 15–10–5
| Pete Spratt
| Submission (rear-naked choke)
| RSF: Shooto Challenge 2
| 
| align=center| 1
| align=center| 0:46
| Belleville, Illinois, United States
|Middleweight bout.
|-
| Loss
| align=center| 14–10–5
| Robbie Lawler
| Decision (unanimous)
| UFC 45
| 
| align=center| 3
| align=center| 5:00
| Uncasville, Connecticut, United States
| 
|-
| Win
| align=center| 14–9–5
| Derrick Noble
| Submission (rear-naked choke)
| RSF: Shooto Challenge
| 
| align=center| 2
| align=center| 2:04
| Belleville, Illinois, United States
| 
|-
| Win
| align=center| 13–9–5
| Chatt Lavender
| Technical submission (triangle choke)
| Absolute Fighting Championships 5
| 
| align=center| 1
| align=center| 0:55
| Fort Lauderdale, Florida, United States
| 
|-
| Win
| align=center| 12–9–5
| LaVerne Clark
| Decision (unanimous)
| Battleground 1: War Cry
| 
| align=center| 3
| align=center| 5:00
| Chicago, Illinois, United States
| 
|-
| Loss
| align=center| 11–9–5
| Koji Oishi
| Decision (split)
| Pancrase: Hybrid 4
| 
| align=center| 3
| align=center| 5:00
| Tokyo, Japan
| 
|-
| Win
| align=center| 11–8–5
| Aaron Riley
| KO (punch)
| HOOKnSHOOT: Boot Camp 1.1
| 
| align=center| 1
| align=center| 3:31
| Evansville, Indiana, United States
| 
|-
| Loss
| align=center| 10–8–5
| Izuru Takeuchi
| Decision (majority)
| Pancrase: Spirit 9
| 
| align=center| 3
| align=center| 5:00
| Tokyo, Japan
|Middleweight bout.
|-
| Win
| align=center| 10–7–5
| Yuji Hoshino
| Submission (triangle choke)
| Pancrase: Spirit 7
| 
| align=center| 1
| align=center| 2:09
| Tokyo, Japan
|Middleweight bout.
|-
| Loss
| align=center| 9–7–5
| Nick Diaz
| Decision (split)
| IFC Warriors Challenge 17
| 
| align=center| 3
| align=center| 5:00
| Porterville, California, United States
| 
|-
| Win
| align=center| 9–6–5
| Kazuo Misaki
| Decision (unanimous)
| Pancrase: Proof 7
| 
| align=center| 3
| align=center| 5:00
| Yokohama, Japan
|Middleweight bout.
|-
| Win
| align=center| 8–6–5
| Jake Ambrose
| Submission (rear-naked choke)
| Cage Rage 2
| 
| align=center| 1
| align=center| 1:49
| Kokomo, Indiana, United States
| 
|-
| Draw
| align=center| 7–6–5
| Dave Strasser
| Draw
| Reality Submission Fighting 3
| 
| align=center| 1
| align=center| 18:00
| Illinois, United States
| 
|-
| Draw
| align=center| 7–6–4
| Nick Hide
| Draw
| Circle City Challenge
| 
| align=center| 3
| align=center| 5:00
| Indianapolis, Indiana, United States
| 
|-
| Win
| align=center| 7–6–3
| Beaver Beaver
| Submission (rear-naked choke)
| Bad Boy Competition
| 
| align=center| 1
| align=center| 2:18
| United States
| 
|-
| Win
| align=center| 6–6–3
| Mike Haltom
| TKO (submission to punches)
| Bad Boy Competition
| 
| align=center| 1
| align=center| 3:41
| United States
| 
|-
| Loss
| align=center| 5–6–3
| Ben Earwood
| Decision (unanimous)
| UFC 28
| 
| align=center| 2
| align=center| 5:00
| Atlantic City, New Jersey, United States
|Welterweight debut.
|-
| Loss
| align=center| 5–5–3
| Shonie Carter
| Decision (unanimous)
| Pancrase: 2000 Anniversary Show
| 
| align=center| 3
| align=center| 3:00
| Yokohama, Japan
| 
|-
| Win
| align=center| 5–4–3
| Taro Obata
| Submission (arm-triangle choke)
| Pancrase: Trans 5
| 
| align=center| 1
| align=center| 2:56
| Tokyo, Japan
|Middleweight debut.
|-
| Loss
| align=center| 4–4–3
| Daisuke Ishii
| Decision (unanimous)
| Pancrase: Trans 4
| 
| align=center| 1
| align=center| 10:00
| Tokyo, Japan
| 
|-
| Win
| align=center| 4–3–3
| CJ Fernandes
| Submission (triangle choke)
| HOOKnSHOOT: Double Fury 1
| 
| align=center| 1
| align=center| 3:54
| United States
| 
|-
| Loss
| align=center| 3–3–3
| Keiichiro Yamamiya
| Decision (unanimous)
| Pancrase: Trans 1
| 
| align=center| 1
| align=center| 10:00
| Tokyo, Japan
|Light Heavyweight debut.
|-
| Draw
| align=center| 3–2–3
| Ikuhisa Minowa
| Draw
| Pancrase: Breakthrough 11
| 
| align=center| 1
| align=center| 15:00
| Yokohama, Japan
| 
|-
| Loss
| align=center| 3–2–2
| Dave Menne
| Decision (unanimous)
| Extreme Challenge 29
| 
| align=center| 2
| align=center| 5:00
| Hayward, Wisconsin, United States
| 
|-
| Win
| align=center| 3–1–2
| Luke Pedigo
| Submission (guillotine choke)
| HOOKnSHOOT: Millennium
| 
| align=center| 1
| align=center| 1:57
| United States
| 
|-
| Draw
| align=center| 2–1–2
| Takafumi Ito
| Draw
| Pancrase: 1999 Neo-Blood Tournament Opening Round
| 
| align=center| 2
| align=center| 3:00
| Tokyo, Japan
| 
|-
| Loss
| align=center| 2–1–1
| Jason DeLucia
| Decision (majority)
| Pancrase: Breakthrough 7
| 
| align=center| 1
| align=center| 10:00
| Tokyo, Japan
| 
|-
| Win
| align=center| 2–0–1
| Daisuke Watanabe
| Submission (armbar)
| Pancrase: Breakthrough 6
| 
| align=center| 1
| align=center| 5:30
| Tokyo, Japan
| 
|-
| Draw
| align=center| 1–0–1
| Osami Shibuya
| Draw
| Pancrase: Breakthrough 4
| 
| align=center| 1
| align=center| 15:00
| Yokohama, Japan
| 
|-
| Win
| align=center| 1–0
| Bo Hershberger
| TKO (submission to punches)
| Neutral Grounds 10
| 
| align=center| 1
| align=center| 11:33
| Muncie, Indiana, United States
|

Professional boxing record 

|-
| colspan=8|13 Wins (7 knockouts, 6 decisions), 1 Loss (1 decision), 1 Draw
|-
| style="border-style: none none solid solid; background: #e3e3e3"|Res.
| style="border-style: none none solid solid; background: #e3e3e3"|Record
| style="border-style: none none solid solid; background: #e3e3e3"|Opponent
| style="border-style: none none solid solid; background: #e3e3e3"|Type
| style="border-style: none none solid solid; background: #e3e3e3"|Rd., Time
| style="border-style: none none solid solid; background: #e3e3e3"|Date
| style="border-style: none none solid solid; background: #e3e3e3"|Location
| style="border-style: none none solid solid; background: #e3e3e3"|Notes
|-
|Win
|13–1–1
| Omar Pittman
|TKO || 7 , 0:42
|June 18, 2005 || Rising Sun, IN ||
|-
|Win
|12–1–1
| Verdell Smith
|UD || 8
|November 27, 2004 || Rising Sun, IN ||
|-
|Win
|11–1–1
| Thomas Kirk
|UD || 6
|October 19, 2004 || Indianapolis, IN ||
|-
|Win
|10–1–1
| Jonathan Corn
|UD || 8
|May 1, 2004 || Indianapolis, IN ||
|-
|Win
|9–1–1
| Reggie Strickland
|UD|| 6
|February 3, 2004 || Indianapolis, IN ||
|-
|Loss
|8–1–1
| Shay Mobley
|UD || 8
|October 17, 2003 || Merrillville, IN ||
|-
|Win
|8–0–1
| Darin Johnson
|KO || 3 , 1:37
|October 7, 2003 || Indianapolis, IN ||
|-
|Win
|7–0–1
| Mike Paul
|TKO || 1 , 1:08
|August 5, 2003 || Indianapolis, IN ||
|-
|Win
|6–0–1
| John Moore
|UD || 8
|June 25, 2003 || Evansville, IN
|
|-
|Win
|5–0–1
| Guy Solis
|TKO || 1 , 2:59
|June 3, 2003 || Indianapolis, IN
|
|-
|Win
|4–0–1
| John Moore
|TKO || 8 , 1:43
|April 1, 2003 || Indianapolis, IN
|
|-
|Win
|3–0–1
| Ruben Ruiz
|TKO || 1 , 2:59
|December 3, 2002 || Indianapolis, IN ||
|-
|Win
|2–0–1
| Donnie Penelton
|UD || 4 
|October 1, 2002 || Indianapolis, IN ||
|-
|Win
|1–0–1
| Toris Smith
|TKO || 1 
|August 6, 2002 || Memphis, TN ||
|-
|style="background:#dae2f1;"|Draw
|0–0–1
| Matt Putnam
|PTS || 4
|June 25, 2002 || Baraboo, WI ||

Bare knuckle record

|Win
|align=center|3-0
|JC Llamas
|Decision (unanimous)
|Bare Knuckle FC 4
|
|align=center|5
|align=center|2:00
|Cancun, Mexico
|
|- 
|Win
|align=center|2–0
|Drew Lipton
|KO (punches)
|BKFC 2: A New Era
|
|align=center|1
|align=center|1:18
|Biloxi, Mississippi, United States
|
|- 
|Win
|align=center|1–0
|Lewis Gallant
|TKO (corner stoppage)
|BKB 9
|
|align=center|3
|align=center|1:56
|London, England
|
|-

See also
List of mixed martial artists with professional boxing records

Notes and references

External links

 
Official UFC Profile
 

1974 births
Living people
American male mixed martial artists
Boxers from Indiana
Mixed martial artists from Indiana
Welterweight mixed martial artists
Mixed martial artists utilizing boxing
Mixed martial artists utilizing wrestling
Mixed martial artists utilizing Brazilian jiu-jitsu
Light-heavyweight boxers
Bare-knuckle boxers 
American practitioners of Brazilian jiu-jitsu
Sportspeople from Indianapolis
American male boxers
Ultimate Fighting Championship male fighters